Balchunas Pass is a broad pass between Mount Flint and Mount Petras in the McCuddin Mountains of Marie Byrd Land. It was mapped by the United States Geological Survey from surveys and from U.S. Navy air photos, 1959–65, and named by the Advisory Committee on Antarctic Names for Commander Robert C. Balchunas, U.S. Navy, Executive Officer for Antarctic Support Activities during Operation Deep Freeze 1971, 1972, and 1973.

References
 

Mountain passes of Antarctica
Landforms of Marie Byrd Land